In the mathematical field of graph theory, the double-star snark is a snark with 30 vertices and 45 edges.

In 1975,  Rufus Isaacs introduced two infinite families of snarks—the flower snark and the BDS snark, a family that includes the two Blanuša snarks, the Descartes snark and the Szekeres snark (BDS stands for Blanuša Descartes Szekeres). Isaacs also discovered one 30-vertex snark that does not belong to the BDS family and that is not a flower snark — the double-star snark.

As a snark, the double-star graph is a connected, bridgeless cubic graph with chromatic index equal to 4. The double-star snark is non-planar and non-hamiltonian but is hypohamiltonian. It has book thickness 3 and queue number 2.

Gallery

References 

Individual graphs
Regular graphs